HollandExel (legally Exel Airlines B.V.) was an airline based in Amsterdam, the Netherlands. It operated charter services for tour operators.

History
The airline was established in 2003, from the remains of the defunct Air Holland, taking over its fleet of Boeing 767s. It was formerly legally known as ATR Leasing VI and was established as a subsidiary of the Dutch holding company ExelAviation Group. The charter carrier  started operations in February 2004 and operated mainly on behalf of TUI Travel and Thomas Cook AG. Two sister airlines were set up; BelgiumExel in Belgium to operate long haul flights on behalf of Thomas Cook, and DutchCaribbeanExel in the Dutch Antilles for scheduled flights to Amsterdam. 

However, after the latter pulled out of all contracts, HollandExel was on the verge of bankruptcy. It had been operating under bankruptcy protection together with the entire ExelAviation Group since January 2005. While EAG had gone bankrupt, HollandExel was purchased by TUI which renamed it Arkefly, making it the Dutch inhouse charter airline for Arke, Holland International and Kras Vakanties.

Destinations

HollandExel operated an international scheduled service to Curaçao and charter services from Amsterdam to the following destinations:

Fleet
HollandExel operated the following aircraft:

See also
List of defunct airlines of the Netherlands

References
 Airline Codes Website
 Flight International, 5–11 April 2005

Citations

External links

 HollandExel (Archive)

Defunct airlines of the Netherlands
Airlines established in 2003
Airlines disestablished in 2005
ExelAviation
Dutch companies established in 2003
Dutch companies disestablished in 2005